Hossein Niknam (born 29 May 1951) is an Iranian fencer. He competed in the individual and team foil events at the 1976 Summer Olympics.

References

External links
 

1951 births
Living people
Iranian male foil fencers
Olympic fencers of Iran
Fencers at the 1976 Summer Olympics
20th-century Iranian people